Manuel Guerra may refer to:

 Manuel Guerra (sport shooter) (1889–?), Portuguese sport shooter
 Manuel Guerra (swimmer) (born 1928), Spanish swimmer
 Manuel Guerra Jr. (born 1967), American ice sledge hockey player
 Manuel Ignacio Guerra (born 1993), Mexican footballer